Vikingavallen  is a football stadium in Täby kyrkby, Sweden and the home stadium for the football team IK Frej. Vikingavallen has a total capacity of 2,650 spectators.

References 

Football venues in Sweden